McEwens (originally known as James McEwen & Co.) was a department store located in the Scottish city of Perth. Specialising in homeware, it was established in March 1868, and was in business for nearly 150 years. It closed in March 2016, along with its branches in Oban and Ballater, with the loss of over 100 jobs. Its store location, at 56 St John's Street, was taken over in 2017 by Beales, an English department-store chain, but that has also since closed.

The store's outbuildings, on Perth's Watergate, were proposed for demolition in 2019, to be replaced by housing.

References

External links
"McEwens of Perth, Scotland Wools, 1961" – The Vintage Traveler

Buildings and structures in Perth, Scotland
Clothing retailers of Scotland
Department stores of the United Kingdom
Retail buildings in Scotland
Department store buildings in the United Kingdom
Retail companies established in 1868
British companies established in 1868